The 2011–12 Minnesota Golden Gophers men's basketball team represented the University of Minnesota in the college basketball season of 2011–2012. The team's head coach, Tubby Smith was in his fifth year at Minnesota. The Golden Gophers played their home games at Williams Arena in Minneapolis, Minnesota, U.S., and are members of the newly expanded Big Ten Conference.

Season
With the departure of seniors Blake Hoffarber and Al Nolen, the Gophers entered the season under the leadership of returning members, including veterans Trevor Mbakwe and Ralph Sampson III.

The Gophers also lost junior Colton Iverson, who transferred to play for the Colorado State Rams at the end of the previous season.

On November 27, during the championship game of the Old Spice Classic, Trevor Mbakwe tore his ACL and missed the remainder of the season.

Freshman guard Andre Hollins was named to the All-Tournament Team at the conclusion of the Big Ten tournament championship game on March 11.

Roster

2011–12 schedule and results

|-
! colspan="9" style=|Exhibition

|-
! colspan="9" style=|Regular season

|-
! colspan="9" style=|Big Ten regular season

|-
! colspan="9" style=|Big Ten tournament

|-
! colspan="9" style=|NIT'''

Rankings

References

Minnesota Golden Gophers men's basketball seasons
Minnesota
Minnesota
Minnesota Golden Gophers men's basketball
Minnesota Golden Gophers men's basketball